The Nikšići was one of the historical tribes in the Ottoman Sanjak of Herzegovina, constituting the Nikšić nahija. It was part of Old Herzegovina, that in 1858 was de facto incorporated into the Principality of Montenegro.

Origins 
The Nikšići are mentioned alongside numerous Montenegrin and Herzegovinian tribes in the 14th and 15th archives from Dubrovnik and Kotor. While most of them are only described as katuns, the Nikšići themselves are explicitly referred to as Vlachs. The name Nikšić is a Slavic patronym derived from Nikša, the likely founder of the tribe. Nikša is a hypocoristic of Nikola and was common during the Middle Ages in the littoral cities of Zeta and Dalmatia, especially in Dubrovnik. Another theory suggests that Nikšić comes from the Albanian diminutive Niksh, with the Slavic suffix -ić.

History
The first mention of the tribe Nikšići comes from a Ragusan letter to Jelena Balšić dated 1399. In the same year they are mentioned as "Nikšić of Zeta" (Nichsich de Zenta) in Kotoran documents. In 1447 it was recorded that they had captured a Ragusan messenger and sold him to the Turks. In 1455 they are listed among tribes and villages in Zeta who signed an agreement with Venetians in Vranjina. 

The tribe was led by the vojvoda, which had been established after conflicts within the tribe as a compromise. They simultaneously used the name Onogošti until 17th century and further.

The burning of Saint Sava's remains after the Banat Uprising provoked revolts in other regions against the Ottomans. Grdan, the vojvoda of Nikšić, organized revolt with Serbian Patriarch Jovan Kantul. In 1596, an uprising broke out in Bjelopavlići, then spread to Drobnjaci, Nikšići, Piva and Gacko (see: Serb Uprising of 1596–97). It was suppressed due to lack of foreign support.

Legacy
According to oral tradition, collected by the Serbian historian Petar Šobajić, the tribe dates back to the 14th century and is named after Nikša, who was the son of Ilijan, the ban of Grbalj, and who was maternally a Nemanjić. Expanding on this, Risto Kovijanić said that Nikša may have moved from lands around the Morača monastery to the župa of Onogošt after the death of the Serbian prince Stefan Vukanović Nemanjić ( 1252), his relative. It is considered that the tribe was not founded by a single individual, but by several related families led by Nikša. The Nikšići found native tribes in their new territory: in the west were the Riđani (the strongest tribe), in the župa itself were the Lužani, while in the north, by the mountains Vojnik and Durmitor were the Drobnjaci. The Nikšići were a very strong tribe, having successfully conquered the Lužani and pushed back the border of the Drobnjaci territory, while tradition speaks of many conflicts between them and the Riđani. In the 16th century, the Nikšići and the Riđani were the only tribes still present in the area.

References

Sources
 
 
 
 

Nikšić
Ottoman period in the history of Montenegro
Geography of Montenegro
Sanjak of Herzegovina
Tribes of Montenegro